The Gitxsan language , or Gitxsanimaax (also rendered Gitksan, Giatikshan, Gityskyan, Giklsan and Sim Algyax), is an endangered Tsimshianic language of northwestern British Columbia, closely related to the neighboring Nisga’a language. The two groups are, however, politically separate and prefer to refer to Gitxsan and Nisga'a as distinct languages. According to the Report on the status of B.C First Nations Languages there are 523 fluent speakers, 639 that understand or somewhat speak and 344 learning speakers.

Gitxsan means "People of the Skeena River" ( being the name of the Skeena in Gitxsan).

Dialects 
Gitxsan language is primarily separated into Geenix or Eastern and Gyeets or Western Gitxsan, although each village has its own dialect. The Geenix or Eastern villages include Kispiox (Ansbayaxw), Glen Vowell (Sigit'ox), and Hazelton (Git-an'maaxs). The Gyeets or Western villages include Kitwanga (Gjtwjngax), Gitanyow (Git-antaaw) and Kitseguecla (Gijigyukwhla). The main differences between dialects include a lexical shift in vowels and stop lenition use present only in the Eastern dialects. The largest differences in language and culture exist between Eastern and Western Gitxsan, rather than between each village.

History and usage 
The University of Northern British Columbia and Siiwiixo'osxwim Wilnataahl Gitksan Society (Gitksan Language Society) set up a Developmental Standard Term Certificate program offered through Northwest Community College, with all courses offered in Hazelton, BC. The program is designed to help revitalize Gitxsan language by allowing those who complete it to teach language and culture courses at the elementary and secondary school level in the community.

In the spring of 2018, an online dictionary app was released in collaboration with members of Gitksan Nation and researchers at the University of British Columbia. The app includes various dialects of Gitxsan, and includes audio from different villages. Flashcards, stories, and histories are also included in addition to functioning as a dictionary. This app is based on a print dictionary produced in 1973 by Lonnie Hindle and Bruce Rigsby. With its launch, the app briefly held a top spot in Google Play's education category and accumulated around 500 downloads in its first week.

Phonology
The Gitxsan inventory is as follows:

The mid and high vowels are nearly in complementary distribution, suggesting that Gitxsan once had a three-vowel system. Short mid vowels are emerging. Schwa only occurs in unstressed syllables. /e:/ and /o:/ have short allophones [e] and [o] in certain positions.

Voiceless stop sounds can also have voiced allophones of [b d d͡z ɡʲ ɡʷ ɢ].

References

Further reading
 

 

 Halpin, Marjorie, and Margaret Seguin (1990) "Tsimshian Peoples: Southern Tsimshian, Coast Tsimshian, Nishga, and Gitksan."  In Handbook of North American Indians, Volume 7: Northwest Coast, ed. by Wayne Suttles, pp. 267–284. Washington: Smithsonian Institution).
 Hindle, Lonnie and Bruce Rigsby (1973) A Short Practical Dictionary of the Gitksan language, Northwest Anthropological Research Notes 1:1-60.

External links
 Official website of the Gitxsan People
 First Voices Gitsenimx̱ community language portal
 First Nations Languages of British Columbia Gitksan page, with link to bibliography
 A Selection of Prayers Translated from the Book of Common Prayer in the Giatikshan Language for Use at the Public Services 1881 translation by Anglican missionary William Ridley
 OLAC resources in and about the Gitxsan language
 ELAR archive of Gitskan

L01
Tsimshianic languages
Endangered Tsimshianic languages
Indigenous languages of the Pacific Northwest Coast
First Nations languages in Canada